Canal N is a Peruvian pay television news channel in Peru. It was founded as a joint venture between El Comercio and Telefónica.

External links
 Official Site 

24-hour television news channels
Television stations in Peru
Spanish-language television stations
Television channels and stations established in 1999
1999 establishments in Peru